Abraham Louis “Bram” Schneiders (1 October 1925 — 2 July 2020) was a Dutch writer and diplomat. He was ambassador of the Netherlands to Cameroon, Equatorial Guinea, Central African Republic, Gabon, Chad (1979-1982), Zimbabwe (1982-1986); New Zealand, Fiji, Tonga; Samoa (1986-1990) and Tuvalu (1987-1990).

As writer he had pseudonyms Drievoeter and A. van Anders.

Career 
Schneiders was born in Castricum as son of Louis Abraham Schneiders (1893-1956), who was a medical doctor since 1931 at the GG&GD in Rotterdam, and Anna Margaretha Dorothea Schlüter (1897-1992). He studied Dutch East Indies Jurisprudence at the University of Utrecht and Leiden. He served in the army between 1948 and 1950 in Indonesia during the Indonesian National Revolution. Subsequently, he worked at the Ministry of Education, Arts and Sciences, as deputy secretary of the Board of Curators of the Leiden University. From 1964 until his retirement in 1990 he worked at the Ministry of Foreign Affairs. He held positions at the Dutch embassies in Nigeria, Lagos (1969-1973) and Indonesia (1973-1977). From 1978 to 1979 he was a spokesman for the Ministry of Foreign Affairs. Thereafter he was ambassador of the Netherlands to Cameroon, Equatorial Guinea, Central African Republic, Gabon; Chad (1979-1982; based in Yaoundé), Zimbabwe (1982-1986); and based in Wellington to New Zealand, Fiji, Tonga; West-Samoa (1986-1990) and Tuvalu (1987-1990).

He became Officer of the Orde van Oranje-Nassau in 1981.

Writer 
As a writer he made his debut in 1951 with the short story de Kanonnen, published in the literary magazine Libertinage. Later he wrote short stories for Hollands Weekblad, Hollands Maandblad and De Gids. He wrote several volumes for Querido. From 1965 he wrote a weekly column for  NRC Handelsblad using the name Drievoeter.

Personal 
Schneiders was the brother of mayor Frits Schneiders (1923–2002). He married in 1954 Elisabeth “Elleke” Vreede (1924-2014). They had several children together.

He died on 2 July 2020 in Hilversum.

Bibliography 

 Langs het schrikdraad (1961)
 Een kater in blik (1963)
 De trek van de struisvogel (1965)
 [as A. Anders] Rapport van de secretarisvogel (1981)
 In de boom (1987)
 Het verbrokkeld paradijs (1991)

References

External links 
 Schneiders at DBNL

Dutch male writers
Ambassadors of the Netherlands to Cameroon
Ambassadors of the Netherlands to New Zealand
Ambassadors of the Netherlands to Zimbabwe
1925 births
2020 deaths
People from Castricum